Eternal Recurrence may refer to:

Eternal recurrence, a theory that the universe and all existence is perpetually recurring

Music
 Eternal Recurrence, a 2012 album by Sear Bliss
 Eternal Recurrence (EP), a 2017 EP by Deradoorian
 "Eternal Recurrence", a song by Miyuki Hashimoto from the 2010 album Espressivo
 "Eternal Recurrence", a song by Ride from the 2019 album This Is Not a Safe Place
 "Eternal Recurrence", music of the Mana series of video games
 The Eternal Recurrence, a 1999 musical composition by Gerald Barry
 "Cambrian II: Eternal Recurrence", a song by The Ocean from the 2018 album Phanerozoic I: Palaeozoic

Other uses
Eternal Recurrence, a 2014 art installation by Jim Campbell
Eternal Recurrence, a mural by Lorser Feitelson (1898–1978)
Xak III: The Eternal Recurrence, a fantasy role-playing video game

See also
 Eternal return (disambiguation)
 Thus Spoke Zarathustra, Nietzsche's philosophical novel dealing with the idea of eternal recurrence